Brooks Beasts Track Club is a professional running team based in the Seattle, sponsored by Brooks. The group includes runners specializing in distances from the 800 meters to the 5000 meters. The group trains primarily in Seattle, WA under coach Danny Mackey.

Brooks Beasts was formed in 2013 when Brooks took up the task of launching a professional track team with the goal of helping athletes win medals at National, World, and Olympic championships.

Beasts athletes include National, Worlds and Olympic qualifiers and multiple NCAA All-Americans, NCAA champions, and record-holders in both Division 1 and Division 2. It has featured numerous U.S. Top 5s and World Top 25 runners.

Members 
The Brooks Beasts have a had many members over the years. Some have left the team for various reasons.

Men 
  (2021)
  (2022)
  (2014)
  (2018)
  (2016)
  (2023)
  (2018)
  (2021)
  (2017)
  (2015)
  (2017)

Women 
  (2021)
  (2018)
  (2022)
  (2019)
  (2020)
Former Members

  (2020-2021)
  (-2020)
  (2014-)
  (2013-)
 
  (2015-)
 (2016-2018)
  (2019-2022)
  (2019-2021)
  (2013-2014)
  (2014-2017)

References

Running
Long-distance running
Track and field organizations
Athletics (track and field) in North America
Track and field clubs in the United States